Dave Rand (born 8 December 1973) is a Welsh former-professional cyclist who represented Wales in the 1998 Commonwealth Games in Kuala Lumpur, riding the road race event.

Palmarès

1996
1st British National Road Race Championships
5th Tour of the Cotswolds, Premier Calendar

1998
1st Perfs Pedal Race, Premier Calendar
6th Archer Grand Prix, Premier Calendar
4th Stage 1, Tour of Lancashire, Premier Calendar
6th British National Road Race Championships

2000
6th 45th GP Lincoln, Premier Calendar

References

External links

1973 births
Living people
Welsh male cyclists
Commonwealth Games competitors for Wales
Cyclists at the 1998 Commonwealth Games
British cycling road race champions
Place of birth missing (living people)